

QN51A Products for animal euthanasia

QN51AA Barbiturates
QN51AA01 Pentobarbital
QN51AA02 Secobarbital
QN51AA30 Combinations of barbiturates
QN51AA51 Pentobarbital, combinations
QN51AA52 Secobarbital, combinations

QN51AX Other products for animal euthanasia
QN51AA50 Combinations

References

N51